James Galdieri may refer to:

 James Anthony Galdieri (1934–2009), American politician from Jersey City
 James J. Galdieri (1900–1944), American politician from Jersey City